Lynne Roberts-Goodwin (born 1954) is an Australian photographer, video and installation artist. As one of Australia's leading contemporary artists, she has influenced a generation of visual arts practitioners depicting nature and the landscape. Her photographic work has been described as "grounded in a deep concern for nature and humanity". She has received numerous awards, and her work is held in private and public collections nationally and internationally.

Life and work
 
Roberts-Goodwin studied at the University of Sydney and University of New South Wales, gaining a postgraduate Master of Fine Art Degree from University of Manchester, Medlock Fine Arts Centre in 1980.
 
Awards and grants from research institutes and museums enabled her to study wildlife in India, America, Australia and United Arab Emirates, where she documented endangered species to form links between the sciences and the visual arts. Her False Tales series (1995) comprised animal images from history and contemporary urban society, while Boris the Dog 2 conceptually investigated 19th and 20th century animal discourse. Her exhibition Blindfold in the AGNSW Contemporary Project Space in 1997 documented the wapiti and its trade from rural Australia to Seoul, Korea. Her installation Tankstream - Into the head of the cove has been on display in Sydney since 1999.
 
Bad Birds is a series of 85 images produced while Roberts-Goodwin was on a residency through the Institute of Electronic Art, New York, in 2001. The images are "anti-portraits" (facing away from the camera) of long-dead birds from the collection of the Department of Ornithology at the Australian Museum in Sydney. From an exhibition entitled Landings, it further develops the imaging of interdependent relationship of humans with animals, and how human feelings are translated to the natural world.
 
The artist's interest in historic and contemporary trade and migration routes continued with the several falconry projects initially undertaken in the United Arab Emirates in 2002 and continuing back and forth with United Arab Emirates, Central Eurasia, Kazakhstan, and western Siberia. Her long series of documentary photographs of contraband birds was described as "post-minimalist or post-conceptualist" art. Her large black and white panoramic photograph of a desolate landscape, shot at night under a full moon, won the Josephine Ulrick and Win Schubert Photography Award in 2010. In 2012, Roberts-Goodwin made a series of photographic/installation works called SWARM.
 
Roberts-Goodwin's work invites the viewer to engage with unfamiliar contexts and global structures of environmental conflict and sites of impact. Regarding her exhibition More Than Ever, The Art Life commented: "Completely removed from a secular sentimentality or faux religiosity, Roberts-Goodwin's images are bracing observations of the world as it is, unadorned and beautiful in their simple majesty."
 
She was an artist-in-residence in Los Angeles, New York, New Delhi, Mumbai, Beirut, Mexico, Paris, and Riyadh. She has been a senior lecturer at the University of New South Wales. She is based in Sydney.

Notable works

Tankstream - Into the head of the cove (1999)
 
Tankstream - Into the head of the cove is an installation set into the pavement in five separate sites from Pitt Street Mall to Alfred Street in Sydney. It consists of coloured glass modules overlapping and angled away from stainless steel lines, creating a diagram mapping the course of the subterranean Tank Stream in relation to the direction of Pitt Street, comparing the natural and man-made conduits of energy in the city. At the final site on Alfred Street the rods splay to represent the delta as the stream flows into Sydney Cove. The installation includes an inscription by Captain Watkin Tench, who recorded the presence of water in Sydney Cove in his diary in 1788. A sixth site was added indoors, in the foyer of City Recital Hall.  The installation is one of Roberts-Goodwin's works that have been seen as "a path to return afresh to what we think we know of the past, and how we think we know it through present engagement and dissemination." Her public works have been characterised by being almost invisible, as she prefers art in city streets and parks to have minimal impact on their surroundings.

Falconry projects (2002-)
 
In 2002, Roberts-Goodwin was first invited to undertake a falconry project at Abu Dhabi Falcon Hospital, Sweihan, Abu Dhabi, by avian veterinarian specialist Dr. Jaime Samour. It was followed by projects undertaken at the Wrsan wildlife sanctuary near Abu Dhabi at the request of Zayed bin Sultan Al Nahyan, President of the United Arab Emirates. Since then, she has been photographing Arabian falcons and falconers to examine "the conceptual issues of the 'perceived exotic' of place and racial belonging", both as a Western stereotype and as a living practice. She has also been liaising with an assisting ornithologists in the region to develop animal passports to assist the regulation of the international rare species trade and the eradication of the illicit hunting-bird market.

Disappearing Act (2005)
 
In 2004, Roberts-Goodwin undertook a project involving the Incense/Frankincense Trade and migration route commencing in Oman, through Yemen then traversing the Kings Highway in Jordan. The Disappearing Act project followed the route indexing many sites of prehistoric villages, biblical towns, Crusader Castles, Nabatean temples, Roman Fortresses, Islamic towns and the key archaeological sites within Jordan. Her work on the project was exhibited at Sherman Gallery Goodhope, Sydney, Australia.

SWARM (2012)
 
SWARM is a series of photographic/installation works that involved imagining the flight of black ravens in high altitude habitats of central Iran, Mexico, U.S.A, India and Northern Cyprus: locations that are extreme in geopolitical, topographical or cultural terms. Roberts-Goodwin's images use "spatial aesthetics"; that is, "the complex entanglements between local and global ideas of place." A digital photograph print from the series, called as the sky falls through five fingers #131 (the "five fingers" are the peaks of the Kyrenia Mountains), won the Hazelhurst Art Award in 2013. Commenting the fact that she was working in very remote locations, the artist said she liked "dirty landscapes, not picturesque landscapes".

Selected solo exhibitions

 1979: Over There, Coventry Gallery, Sydney, Australia
 1980: From Here, Peterloo Gallery, Manchester, United Kingdom
 1981: North/South, Whitworth Gallery, Manchester, United Kingdom
 1981: Drawn, Sloane Street Gallery, London, United Kingdom
 1982: Works 1981 / 1982, Sloane Street Gallery, London, United Kingdom
 1982: Recent O/S Works, Coventry Gallery, Sydney, Australia
 1984: Works 1982 / 1984, IMAGES Gallery, Sydney, Australia
 1984: Site Works, SALLE SANDOZ Gallery, CitC) Internationale des Arts, Paris, France
 1986: Recent Works, Coventry Gallery, Sydney, Australia
 1986: Looking Glass, SALLE SANDOZ Gallery, CitC) Internationale des Arts, Paris, France
 1989: NO SPACE, Camera Lucida Window Space, Sydney, Australia
 1989: Works 1989, Coventry Gallery, Sydney, Australia
 1990: MOMENT, Camera Lucida Window Space, Sydney, Australia
 1990: SPACES OF DISSENSION, ROAR 2 Studios Gallery, Melbourne, Australia
 1991: TERRASCAPE, CITRI Gallery, Melbourne, Australia
 1991: TOUCH, Linden Gallery, Melbourne, Australia
 1992: TOUCH, First Draft Gallery, Sydney, Australia
 1993: 90's Work!, Biota Gallery, Los Angeles, U.S.A.
 1993: PHANTASM, Australian Centre for Photography, Sydney, Australia
 1994: Remote-Half-Light, Perth Institute of Contemporary Art (PICA), Perth, Australia
 1994: Remote-Half-Light, Australian Centre for Contemporary Art, Melbourne, Australia
 1994: A Certain Blindness, Centre for Contemporary Photography, Fitzroy, Melbourne, Australia
 1995: False Tales, Michael Wardell Gallery, Melbourne, Australia
 1995: False Tales, Dishy Dogs, 4 x 4, New Museum of Contemporary Art, New York, U.S.A.
 1995: Blindfold, Artspace, Auckland, New Zealand
 1997: Blindfold, The Art Gallery of New South Wales, Sydney, Australia
 1997: Pink Planks, Artspace, Sydney, Australia
 1999: Solo exhibition at Renard Wardell Gallery, Melbourne, Australia
 2002: Landings, Boutwell Draper Gallery, Sydney, Australia
 2003: Azure, Australian Centre for Photography, Sydney; Cultural Foundation, Abu Dhabi, UAE
 2005: Disappearing Act, Sherman Galleries, Sydney, Australia
 2007: Random Acts, Sherman Galleries, Sydney, Australia
 2014: MORE THAN EVER, .M Contemporary Gallery, Sydney, Australia
 2014: Solo exhibition at Cohen Hadler Contemporary, Sydney, Australia
 2016: "closeupatadistance" Kronenberg Wright Artists Projects, Sydney, Australia

Collections
 
Roberts-Goodwin's work is held in the following public and private collections:
 Art Gallery of New South Wales, Sydney
 National Gallery of Victoria, Melbourne
Museum of Contemporary Art, Sydney, Australia
 Artbank
 Australian Opera Trust
 Gold Coast City Art Gallery
 Goldman Sachs Group, Inc.
 Transfield Foundation/Kumagai Australian Collection
 M Contemporary Gallery, Sydney, Australia
 Aberson Exhibits, Tulsa, Oklahoma, U.S.A.
 Nuova Galleria Morone, Milan, Italy
 TAFE Collection, Bathurst
 RMIT Collection, Melbourne
 Peter Stuyvesant Trust
 Westpac Collection
 Australian Embassy, Abu Dhabi
 Department of Trade & Foreign Affairs, Australia-India Commission, Delhi
 Sheikh Zayhad Bin Sultan Al Nayhan
 Sheikh Mohammad Bin Sultan Al Nayhan, Crown Prince Private Collection
 CitC) Internationale Des Arts, Paris
 University of Illinois, Chicago
 Grosvenor Gallery, Manchester
 Medlock Fine Art Centre, Manchester
 Peterloo Gallery, Manchester
 Sloane Street Gallery, London
 Whitworth Gallery, Manchester
 ERWDA (Environmental Research and Wildlife Development Agency) Collection, Abu Dhabi
 NID Collection, Ahmenabad

Publications
 
 Times Like These, 2012
 More Than Ever: Lynne Roberts Goodwin, Bondi, 2014
 Disappearing Act, 2005
 Random Acts, 2007

Awards
 
 2010: Josephine Ulrick and Win Schubert Photography Award
 2013: Hazelhurst Art Award

Grants
 
Roberts-Goodwin received the following grants:
 
 1979: Basil and Muriel Hooper Travelling Art Scholarship, Art Gallery of New South Wales, Sydney
 1980: Dyason Bequest Artist Travel Grant, Art Gallery of New South Wales, Sydney
 1983: Artists Overseas Travel Grant, Visual Arts/Crafts Board, Australia Council
 1985: London Education Authority Artist Travel Grant, UK
 1989: New Image Research Grant, Australian Film Commission, Sydney
 1998-99: Department of Primary Industries Grant, Australian Quarantine and Inspection Service (AQIS)
 1992-96: Faculty Research Grant, COFA, University of New South Wales, Sydney
 1996-97: New Work Grant, Visual Arts Fund, Australia Council
 1999-2000: Faculty Research Grant, COFA, University of New South Wales, Sydney
 1999-2000: Australia India Foundation Grant, collaboration with World Wildlife Fund and Wilderness India
 2000: UNESCO Sanskriti Artist Asialink Residency, Sanskriti, New Delhi, India
 2001-02: UNSW Research Grant (UAE; Washington, Chicago, US)
 2000-03: UNSW Research Grant (Saudi Arabia; Pakistan; India)
 2003-04: New Work Grant, Visual Arts Fund, Australia Council
 2005-06: New Work Grant, Visual Arts Fund, Australia Council
 2009 New Work Grant, Visual Arts Fund, Australia Council
 2012 New Work Grant, Visual Arts Fund, Australia Council
International Commissions/Projects:
Hashemite Kingdom of Jordan ‘Dead Sea’ Project, 2015-2016
Australia India Institute, ARTIST RETREAT, Jaipur, India 2013
ONDARTE International Artist's Residency, Akumal, Mexico, 2012
Fondation Arabe pour l'Image Artist Residency, Beirut, Lebanon, 2009
AQIS Quarantine Artist-in-Residence, Sydney International Airport, Sydney 2005
ERWDA (Environmental Research Wildlife Development Agency) and Environment Agency Abu Dhabi (EAD) Falcon Hospital Residency, Abu Dhabi, 2002
Rockefeller Foundation Artist Residency, Alfred, New York, 2001
UNESCO Sanskriti Kendra, Delhi, India

References

External links
 

Living people
Australian photographers
Australian contemporary artists
1954 births